Aliens vs. Avatars is a 2011 science fiction film directed by Lewis Schoenbrun. The film is a mockbuster of Alien vs. Predator and Avatar. The film follows the intergalactic battle between a quarrelsome alien race and shape-shifting extraterrestrials, while six college friends find themselves in the middle of the interstellar war. The film stars Jason Lockhart, Kim Argetsinger, Dylan Vox, Georgina Totentino, Marlene Mc'Cohen and Ginny You. 
Aliens vs. Avatars was released onto video, DVD and TV on September 20, 2011. As of at 2021, The film's distributor, Summer Hill Entertainment, refers to the film as "Alien vs. Alien”.

Cast
 Jason Lockhart as Tyler
 Kim Argetsinger as Jesse
 Cassie Fliegel as Ava
 Dylan Vox as Jake
 Marlene Mc'Cohen as Tiffany
 Ginny You as Dana
 Georgina Tolentino as Crystal

Production
The film was shot in Los Angeles, California in the summer of 2010. At the time, its director, Lewis Schoenbrun, was completing post-production work for the film The Amazing Bulk. Shoenbrun considered Aliens vs. Avatars to be a more difficult film to produce, mostly due to multiple shooting locations.

Release and reception
Aliens vs. Avatars did not receive a theatrical release, and was released directly to video, DVD, and television on September 20, 2011. In 2011, it was Schoenbrun's most widely released film.

Horror film blogger Baron Craze panned the movie, saying "[The production's contributors] contribute to an inept dialogue of half baked thoughts, concepts, and Swiss cheese drivel. [...] While cheap effects work for straight-up b-movies, it still needs some fun, and entertainment factor, [...] however this film miss every grade, and contains a laundry list of problems, namely boredom. Similarly, another reviewer named Richard Scheib called it "a marginally better made film of the type that is usually shot on a camcorder over successive weekends by teenage wannabes." The film apparently was better received on the home video market in Japan, with at least one personal reviewer giving it 5/5 stars, saying "At the times in our lives when things get too hectic, we need an utterly useless Z-movie like this to give us time to decompress. There is a price for this kind of pick-me-up that's needed every once in a while. That price is only 500 yen."

In 2012, Aliens vs. Avatars' production studio Tomcat films sued hundreds of "John Doe" defendants in US federal court for allegedly illegally downloading the film in 2012, a suit which has been called a case of copyright trolling.

References

External links
 
 Aliens vs. Avatars on Rotten Tomatoes

2011 science fiction films
2011 films
Mockbuster films
American science fiction films
Films directed by Lewis Schoenbrun
2010s English-language films
2010s American films